is a 2007 Japanese anime loosely based on the 14th century Chinese historical fiction novel Romance of the Three Kingdoms. It was produced by NAS and Konami Digital Entertainment.

Plot
The Imperial Seal has been passed down through the generations of guardians since ancient times. It confers great power unto those it chooses. This is the story of its guardians.

It is a time of war, when great armies clash in terrible battles and great heroes carve their names in history. It is also a time of death and destruction, when the people of the land live in constant fear of the sword. Onto this stage steps the reluctant Rikuson Hakugen (Lu Xun), whose family had been the guardians of the Imperial Seal up until it was stolen by Hakufu Sonsaku, the ruler of the kingdom of Go. At the behest of his mentor, Koumei Shoukatsuryou, (Zhuge Liang) Rikuson offers his services to Sonsaku Sonken with the intention of confirming the will of the Imperial Seal. However, assassins strike down Sonsaku and the Imperial Seal is lost. So begins, Rikuson's journey to recover the Imperial Seal and discover, with the help of his friends, his destiny.

Characters

Anime name followed by (Romance of the Three Kingdoms name) followed by Japanese voice actor.

  Ekitoku Chouhi (Zhang Fei): Onosaka Masaya
  Chouryou Bun'en (Zhang Liao): Yamaguchi Kappei
  Choujou Kofu (Zhang Zhao): Miyazawa Tadashi
  Shiryuu Chou'un (Zhao Yun): Sugiyama Noriaki
  Kannei Kouha (Gan Ning): Suwabe Junichi
  Unchou Kan'u (Guan Yu): Ohkawa Tohru
  Kougai Koufuku (Huang Gai): Ohkawa Tohru
  Genyou Kouso (Huang Zu): Okiayu Ryotaro
  Kyocho Chuukou (Xu Zhu)
  Hakugen Rikuson (Lu Xun): Miyano Mamoru
  Shikei Roshoku (Lu Su): Nojima Kenji
  Shimei Ryoumou (Lu Meng): Ishida Akira
  Ryousou Kouketsu (Ling Cao): Inoue Kazuhiko
  Ryoutou Kouseki (Ling Tong): Saiga Mitsuki
  Gentoku Ryuubi (Liu Bei): Satou Rina
  Shiyu Shokatsukin (Zhuge Jin): Yusa Kouji
  Koumei Shokatsuryou (Zhuge Liang): Koyasu Takehito
  Youhei Shuutai (Zhou Tai)
  Koukin Shuuyu (Zhou Yu): Shin-ichiro Miki
  Chuubou Sonken (Sun Quan): Nabatame Hitomi
  Hakufu Sonsaku (Sun Ce): Matsumoto Yasunori
  Shikou Soujin (Cao Ren): Iwasaki Masami
  Moutoku Sousou (Cao Cao): Mitsuya Yuji
  Taishiji Shigi (Taishi Ci): Itou Kentarou

Release

Episodes

Theme songs
Opening:
 "Nostalgia" by Camino

Ending:
 "Kuon" by Miyano Mamoru

Insert Songs:
 "Koubou" by Miyano Mamoru (episode 25)

Reception

References
 http://yueying.net/dw/?page=names.japanese Names in Romance of the Three Kingdoms in their Chinese and Japanese versions

External links
 https://web.archive.org/web/20070829030103/http://www.koutetsu-sangokushi.jp/file/jsp/
 

Action anime and manga
Fantasy anime and manga
Historical anime and manga
2006 manga
Supernatural anime and manga
Works based on Romance of the Three Kingdoms
Anime series
TV Tokyo original programming